The 1999 FIVB Volleyball World League was the tenth edition of the annual men's international volleyball tournament, played by 12 countries from 28 May to 17 July 1999. The Final Round was held in Mar del Plata, Argentina.

Pools composition

Intercontinental round

Pool A

|}

|}

Pool B

|}

|}

Pool C

|}

|}

Final round
Venue:  Polideportivo Islas Malvinas, Mar del Plata, Argentina

Pool play

Pool D

|}

|}

Pool E

|}

|}

Final four

Semifinals

|}

3rd place match

|}

Final

|}

Final standing

Awards
Most Valuable Player
  Osvaldo Hernández
Best Scorer
  Douglas Chiarotti
Best Libero
  Mirko Corsano
Best Blocker
  Pavel Pimienta
Best Setter
  Raúl Diago
Best Server
  Luigi Mastrangelo
Best Receiver
  Enrique de la Fuente

External links
1999 World League Results
Sports123

FIVB Volleyball World League
FIVB World League
Volleyball
1999 in Argentine sport